Denis Perron (November 22, 1938 – April 23, 1997) was Canadian politician, who represented the riding of Duplessis in the National Assembly of Quebec from 1976 to 1997. He was a member of the Parti Québécois.

He was first elected in the 1976 election, and served until his death in office in 1997.

External links
 

1938 births
1997 deaths
French Quebecers
Parti Québécois MNAs
People from Abitibi-Témiscamingue